Štítnik is a village and municipality in the Rožňava District in the Košice Region of middle-eastern Slovakia.

Geography
The village lies at an altitude of 345 metres and covers an area of 34.54 km2.
It has a population of about 1485 people. The village is situated in the historical region of Gemer. 
It is located about 14 kilometers from Rožňava. The village has a public library, high school and a football pitch. It also has a cinema.

History
Historical discoveries prove that the origin of this settlement dates from the earlier part of the Middle Ages, from the 12th century. The name is Slovak and is derived from Slovak word štít meaning shield, and it could be related to the production of shields and weapons in village. It was mentioned for the first time in 1243 in a charter issued by Hungarian king Béla IV. for Dietrich and Filip from Akóš/Bebek noble family. Štítnik became dominion of Bebek family. Later, it had split up into two branches known by the centre of their dominion. Branch of Bebek family, which had centre in Štítnik became known as Lords of Štítnik (Štítnickí in Slovak, Csetneki in Hungarian).

In 1328 Štítnik got town privileges. During the Middle Ages, it had developed into an important mining town. History of the town was also connected with production of weapons. In 16th century Štítnik under influence of German miners converted to the Lutheranism. Already in the 16th century, first Latin school in the region was opened in Štítnik. In the same century, Štítnik was occupied by Ottomans.

Historic buildings

Lutheran church 
Three-nave Gothic basilica with a polygonal end of the presbytery and a tower was built in the 14th century. It stands on the site of an older Romanesque building from the 13th century. It is a representative family church of the local noble family of Lords from Štítnik (Štítnickí/Csetneki). Large areas of interior walls are covered with medieval frescoes, the oldest are from the last third of the 14th century, the younger from the late 15th and early 16th century. This is the largest collection of medieval murals in Slovakia. Gothic, Renaissance and Baroque styles are represented in this church. The baptistery is Gothic, made from bronze in 1454. Altar is in Renaissance style, with a mannerist painting of the birth of Christ from 1636 (the authorship of the altar paintings is attributed to Hans von Aachen, the court painter of Emperor Rudolf II.). Next to the altar is a Gothic carved stallum from the early 16th century. There are two organs in the church, a smaller Renaissance one from 1639 is located on the upper matroneum and it was donated to the church by the local landowner Gabriel Bakoš, a larger lower Baroque organ is from 1776. There are also numerous funeral monuments, gothic stone tombstones and medieval epitaphs and Renaissance mortuaries. The facades of the church are divided by supporting pillars and windows with a curved arch and linings. The corners have stone squaring. On the south facade is a fresco depicting St. Christopher.

Lutheran church in Štítnik is part of touristic route Gotická cesta (Gothic Route).

Roman Catholic Church of Saint Jude the Apostle 
Baroque building with a segmental end of the presbytery and a tower was built in years 1749 to 1753. The church was built on behalf of Maria Theresa in a purely evangelical town. It underwent modifications in 1896. The facades of the church are divided by pilasters and semicircular windows with arches. The tower grows from the gable façade with niches, terminated by a crown ledge with and a bell-shaped shingled helmet with a lantern. A baroque plaque column was built next to the church.

Water Castle 
Complex of medieval castle, from which two bastions of fortifications from the 16th century have been preserved. It was founded around 1432. The castle belonged to the family of Lords from Štítnik. At the beginning of the 19th century, a classicist manor house was built inside of area, a one-storey two-wing block building.

Other historical buildings 
Several other historical buildings are preserved in village. These include renaissance town hall, rococo style Šebek's mansion and late baroque Sontág's mansion.

References

External links
Profile of gothic evangelical church, Gotická cesta
http://www.statistics.sk/mosmis/eng/run.html
 Štítnik

Villages and municipalities in Rožňava District